Clostridium diolis is a bacterium from the genus Clostridium which has been isolated from decaying straw in  Braunschweig in Germany. Clostridium diolis produces 1,3-propanediol.

References

Further reading
 

 

Bacteria described in 2003
diolis